The Gallant Man Handicap is a discontinued American Thoroughbred horse race first run on June 1, 2008 at Hollywood Park Racetrack in Inglewood, California. Open to horses age three and older, it was contested on Cushion Track synthetic dirt at a distance of 1⅝ miles (13 furlongs). 

The race was named in honor of United States Racing Hall of Fame inductee, Gallant Man.

Winners

Other North American Marathon races 
On dirt: 
 Fort Harrod Stakes
 Valedictory Stakes

On turf:
 San Juan Capistrano Invitational Handicap

References

 The inaugural Gallant Man Handicap at Bloodhorse.com

Discontinued horse races
Horse races in California
Hollywood Park Racetrack
Ungraded stakes races in the United States
Open long distance horse races
Recurring sporting events established in 2008
2008 establishments in California